Sir Hubert Adryan Verneer was Mayor of Dublin from 1660 to 1661.

Adryan was born in Dublin in 1627 and educated at Trinity College Dublin. He was admitted a Freeman of the City of Dublin in 1648. He assumed the additional name of Verneer and was knighted in 1661.

References

Lord Mayors of Dublin
Irish knights
1627 births
Year of death unknown